SOHOware Incorporated is an American companythat produces computer networking devices.  SOHOware, Inc. was founded in 1990 as NDC Communications, changing its name to SOHOware in March 2000. It produces consumer and commercial products, including wireless LANs, ethernet hubs, wireless mesh networks, wireless hotspots, and firewall residential gateways.

Partnerships 
SOHOware claimed strategic partnerships with Intel, Comcast, Cox, and others. In August 2004, Airgo Networks first announced that they would be partnering with SOHOware, among others. September 2005, it was announced that Airgo Networks would be shipping their Wi-Fi chips with network products by several companies, which included SOHOware.

References 

Companies based in Sunnyvale, California
Electronics companies established in 1990
Consumer electronics retailers in the United States
1990 establishments in California